The 1919–20 Prima Categoria season was won by Internazionale.

It was the first championship after World War One.

Regulation
Struggles between minor and major clubs continued after four years of wartime break. The planned split between two national leagues had been forgotten, and the regional FAs became the lords of the tournament, which was expanded to 48 clubs. The championship was divided in a preliminary regional phase of ten matchdays, while the following national phase was split into a semifinal round of ten matchdays and a final round between three clubs.

The main tournament was split in eight groups of six clubs. First and second clubs, together with the third teams of Piedmont, advanced to the national championship. Worst clubs had to ask for re-election.

National championship was split in three groups of six clubs. Group winners advanced to the final group of three clubs. The whole tournament consequently had twenty-two matchdays.

The experimental Southern groups had their own special regulations.

Teams
Six clubs had collapsed during the war. However, Regional FAs agreed to expand the league to 48 clubs. They variously chose to promote, re-elect, or invite clubs to fill the spots they had been granted to.

Pre-league qualifications

Piedmont
Played on October 5, 1919, in Alessandria.

Lombardy
Played on October 5, 1919.

Liguria
All matches played on November 5, 1919, in Genoa. Three available spots.

Round 1

Round 2

Emilia
Matches played on September 29 and October 5, 1919, in Bologna.

Round 1

Round 2

Campania

Round 1

Round 2

Verdicts
Atalanta, Enotria Goliardo, Grifone GC, Sampierdarenese, GS Bolognese, Pro Caserta, SPES Genova, Trevigliese and Alessandrina were admitted to the 1a Categoria.

Amatori Giuoco Calcio Torino, Pastore, Ausonia Pro Gorla, Legnano, Saronno, Varese, Pavia, Carpi, Mantova, and Nazionale Emilia had been previously added to the championship by the Regional FAs.

Northern Italy

Qualifications

Piedmont - Group A

Classification

Results table

Relegation play-off
Played on February 2, 1920, in Novara.

Piedmont - Group B

Classification

Results table

Liguria

Classification

Results table

Lombardy - Group A

Classification

Results table

Qualification playoff
Played on January 4, 1920, in Brescia.

According to season 1919-20's FIGC rules in case of two teams sharing same position a playoff should have been played. When FIGC managers were noticed of too many matches programmed not for promotion or relegation sudden decided to change rules, just because of the few referees available for those matches, and upcoming matches (lower divisions) urged to get started. Later this playoff wasn't considered for the final table.

Relegation playoff
Played on February 15, 1920, in Brescia.

Lombardy - Group B

Classification

Results table

Lombardy - Group C

Classification

Results table

Relegation play-off
Played on February 8, 1920, in Saronno.

Veneto

Classification

Results table

Relegation play-off
Played on March 14, 1920, in Venice.

Emilia

Classification

Results table

Semifinals
The National semifinals had 18 clubs: six from Piedmont and Lombardy FAs, two from the other three Regional FAs.

Group A

Classification

Results table

Group B

Classification

Results table

Group C

Classification

Results table

Final round

Classification

Results

Southern Italy tournament

An experimental amatorial tournament was played in Southern Italy.

Final round
Played on 13 June 1920, in Bologna.

Livorno qualified to the National Final.

National final
Played on 20 June 1920, in Bologna.

Footnotes

References and sources
Almanacco Illustrato del Calcio - La Storia 1898-2004, Panini Edizioni, Modena, September 2005

Italy
 
1920